Azo dyes are organic compounds bearing the functional group R−N=N−R′, in which R and R′ are usually aryl and substituted aryl groups. They are a commercially important family of azo compounds, i.e. compounds containing the C-N=N-C linkage. Azo dyes are synthetic dyes and do not occur naturally. Most azo dyes contain only one azo group, but some dyes contain two or three azo groups, called "diazo dyes" and "triazo dyes" respectively. Azo dyes comprise 60-70% of all dyes used in food and textile industries. Azo dyes are widely used to treat textiles, leather articles, and some foods. Chemically related derivatives of azo dyes include azo pigments, which are insoluble in water and other solvents.

Classes
Many kinds of azo dyes are known, and several classification systems exist. Some classes include disperse dyes, metal-complex dyes, reactive dyes, and substantive dyes. Also called direct dyes, substantive dyes are employed for cellulose-based textiles, which includes cotton. The dyes bind to the textile by non-electrostatic forces. In another classification, azo dyes can be classified according to the number of azo groups.

Physical properties, structure, and bonding
As a consequence of п-delocalization, aryl azo compounds have vivid colors, especially reds, oranges, and yellows. An example is Disperse Orange 1. Some azo compounds, e.g., methyl orange, are used as acid-base indicators. Most DVD-R/+R and some CD-R discs use blue azo dye as the recording layer.

Azo dyes are solids. Most are salts, the colored component being the anion usually, although some cationic azo dyes are known. The anionic character of most dyes arises from the presence of 1-3 sulfonic acid groups, which are fully ionized at the pH of the dyed article:
RSO3H   →   RSO3−  +  H+
Most proteins are cationic, thus dyeing of leather and wool corresponds to an ion exchange reaction. The anionic dye adheres to these articles through electrostatic forces. Cationic azo dyes typically contain quaternary ammonium centers.

Preparation
Most azo dyes are prepared by azo coupling, which entails an electrophilic substitution reaction of an aryl diazonium cation with another compound, the coupling partner. Generally, coupling partners are other aromatic compounds with electron-donating groups: 
 + Ar′H → ArN=NAr′ + H+
In practice, acetoacetic amide are widely used as coupling partners:
 + Ar′NHC(O)CH2C(O)Me → ArN=NCH(C(O)Me)(C(O)NHAr′) + H+

Azo dyes are also prepared by the condensation of nitrated aromatic compounds with anilines followed by reduction of the resulting azoxy intermediate:
ArNO2 + Ar′NH2 → ArN(O)=NAr′ + H2O
ArN(O)=NAr′ + C6H12O6 → ArN=NAr′ + C6H10O6 + H2O
For textile dying, a typical nitro coupling partner would be disodium 4,4′-dinitrostilbene-2,2′-disulfonate. Typical aniline partners are shown below. Since anilines are prepared from nitro compounds, some azo dyes are produced by partial reduction of aromatic nitro compounds.

Many azo dyes are produced by reactions from pre-existing azo compounds. Typical reactions include metal complexation and acylation.

Azo pigments
Azo pigments are similar in chemical structure to azo dyes, but they lack solubilizing groups. Because they are practically insoluble in all solvents, they are not readily purified, and thus require highly purified precursors.

Azo pigments are important in a variety of plastics, rubbers, and paints (including artist's paints). They have excellent coloring properties, mainly in the yellow to red range, as well as good lightfastness. The lightfastness depends not only on the properties of the organic azo compound, but also on the way they have been absorbed on the pigment carrier.

Azo pigments amongst food pigments are the oldest and also the most widely used. They were discovered by Peter Griess in 1858.

Biodegradation
In order for dyes to be useful, they must possess a high degree of chemical and photolytic stability. As a result of this stability, photolysis is not considered to be a degradation pathway for azo dyes. In order to prolong the lifetime of products dyed with azo dyes, it is essential to ensure stability against microbial attack, and tests have shown that azo dyes biodegrade negligibly in short term tests under aerobic conditions. Under anaerobic conditions, however, discoloration may be observed as a consequence of biodegradation.

Safety and regulation
Many azo pigments are non-toxic, although some, such as dinitroaniline orange, ortho-nitroaniline orange, or pigment orange 1, 2, and 5 are mutagenic and carcinogenic.

Azo dyes derived from benzidine are carcinogens; exposure to them has classically been associated with bladder cancer. Accordingly, the production of benzidine azo dyes was discontinued in the 1980s in many western countries.

European regulation
Certain azo dyes degrade under reductive conditions to release any of a group of defined aromatic amines. Consumer goods which contain listed aromatic amines originating from azo dyes were prohibited from manufacture and sale in European Union countries in September 2003. As only a small number of dyes contained an equally small number of amines, relatively few products were affected.

See also 
 Azo coupling
 Ponceau 4R
 Ponceau S
 Glycoazodyes

References

 
Organic pigments